Worms Ultimate Mayhem is a 3D artillery turn-based tactics video game developed by Team17. The game is a re-release of Worms 4: Mayhem with improved graphics. It features all-new content, story mode voice acting by Guy Harris, and other gameplay fixes such as reworked camera controls. The game features turn-based gameplay, a single-player campaign, and both local and online multiplayer. While primarily based on Worms 4: Mayhem, Ultimate Mayhem also includes content from Worms 3D, with its campaign and multiplayer maps included in the game.

The game was released as a digital download on September 28, 2011 for Microsoft Windows and Xbox 360 and on February 14, 2012 for PlayStation 3.

Gameplay 
As with all previous 3D Worms games, Worms Ultimate Mayhem features a 3D, turn-based artillery strategy that allows player to move freely in all directions. In the game lobby, players are able to choose from a wide variety of different weapons and use them when the game starts. At the start of the game, each player takes control of a team of worms. Due to the game's turned-base nature, each player controls one worm at a time within a set time limit; when the time limit expires, the worm fires a weapon, or the worm takes damage for any reason, the player's turn ends and game proceeds to the next player's turn.

The objective of the game is to eliminate all of the enemy team worms. There are two ways that a worm can be eliminated. The simplest, usual way is to deplete the worm of its health using any of the weapons available; some weapons provide the ability to push or knock back worms. The other, faster way is to knock the worm into the water, causing it to die as soon as it comes there. Once all worms from a team are eliminated, that team is out of play. The team with worms left standing is the winner.

Multiplayer gameplay allows for up to four players, online or locally, where they can choose from a few different game modes, such as Statue Defend, Homelands, and Deathmatch. In the classic Deathmatch game mode, the objective is simply to eliminate all opposing team worms. In Homelands, each team is given a home base and can only collect crates from the middle area, though the objective is the same as in Deathmatch. Statue Defend is similar to Homelands, but every time a worm dies, it will respawn in full health within its team's base, and there are also bird statues in each base, so the objective is to destroy all opponents' bird statues.

Single-player gameplay allows players to test their skill against AI opponents through a set of game modes, where they can also learn to familiarize themselves with the environment and the surrounding. These game modes include a tutorial series, a challenge series and a story mode, all carried over from Worms 4: Mayhem, as well as a remastered Worms 3D campaign mode. Players can earn coins and unlock items for purchase in the shop through single-player gameplay.

Weapons 
All weapons and utilities in Worms Ultimate Mayhem are carried over from Worms 4: Mayhem, along with the Binoculars from Worms 3D. These range from classic weapons such as bazooka, fire punch and concrete donkey, to newer weapons like poison arrow, sentry gun and bovine blitz.

Customization 
Players are able to customize their worm character with different accessories to show off their unique style and personality. Players can also customize their weapon; creating something new and powerful to face off enemy worms.

Development

Reception 
Worms Ultimate Mayhem received "mixed or average" reviews, according to review aggregator Metacritic.

References

External links
 

2011 video games
Artillery video games
PlayStation 3 games
PlayStation Network games
Strategy video games
Video game compilations
Video games developed in the United Kingdom
Windows games
Worms games
Xbox 360 Live Arcade games
Video games about time travel